AIDS/LifeCycle (ALC) is a seven-day cycling tour through California starting in San Francisco and ending in Los Angeles.

Description
AIDS/LifeCycle is a charity event to raise money for HIV/AIDS services and raise HIV/AIDS awareness.  Participants (riders, roadies, and staff) raise money throughout the year.  In the first week of June, the riders cycle from San Francisco to Los Angeles with the support of the roadies and staff.  For seven days, ALC passes through communities in California as a memorial to those who have died of AIDS and as an event to raise awareness about HIV/AIDS.  Each day of riding can range from 40-100+ miles.  At the end of each day of riding, cyclists arrive in a camp to eat, shower, and rest before riding out again the next morning.  Currently (as of ALC 6-8) the route is a total of about 545 miles.  Mileage may change due to route/road constructions and availability of campsites.

History
In 2002, AIDS/LifeCycle was started by former Pallotta Teamworks Vice President Kevin Honeycutt, replacing the Pallotta Teamworks California AIDSRide after it was mired in controversy.

Logo TV produced a multiple episode show for its network called 'The Ride: 7 Days to End AIDS'.  The show highlights the experiences of several cyclists both those who have lost family and those who are HIV survivors.  The show is available for rent from Netflix.

In 2008, AIDS/Lifecycle closed registration early because of an unprecedented number of registrants.

See also
 List of health related charity fundraisers
 AIDSRide
 Positive Pedalers
 AIDS Vaccine 200

References

External links
AIDS/LifeCycle

Health-related fundraisers
Health charities in the United States
Events in California
Medical and health organizations based in California